Straight into Darkness is a 2004 American horror war film directed by Jeff Burr and starring Ryan Francis and Scott MacDonald. It was produced by Mark Hanna and Chuck Williams.

Plot
Two American World War II soldiers, both about to be court martialed for cowardice near the end of the war, escape when the Military Police Jeep they are riding in hits a land mine. They flee over the presumably French or Belgian countryside when they run into a band of partisans consisting of children led by an adult couple. The partisans, believing the Americans are German impostors, initially take the soldiers prisoner. The partisans are later forced to trust the Americans when they are about to be attacked by a strong force of German soldiers who they falsely believe are after them. The Americans agree to help the partisans fight the Germans if they are released. The German commanders press the attack,  however, they have ulterior motives for the attack and are not pursuing the partisans after all.

Cast
Ryan Francis as Losey
Scott MacDonald as Demming
Linda Thorson as Maria 
James LeGros as Soldier
Daniel Roebuck as Soldier
David Warner as Deacon
Liliana Perepelicinic as Anna
Gabriel Spahiu as The Lunatic Priest
Nelu Dinu as Nelu
Mihai Verbintschi as Buchler
Ion Bechet as Sergeant

Release

Home media
The film was released on DVD by MCA Home Video and Bleiberg on June 6 and November 13, 2006 respectively. In 2010, it was released twice by Screen Media as both a single-feature, and multi-feature movie pack. It was released for the first time on Blu-ray by Willette Acquisition Corp. on December 8, 2015.

Reception

Scott Weinberg from eFilmCritic gave the film 4/4 stars, writing, "Jeff Burr's Straight Into Darkness starts out like a straight war flick, almost turns into a horror movie, slowly becomes a moving piece of drama, and spits you out on the other side both impressed with the end product...and more than a little shaken." Robert Koehler of Variety wrote, "Jeff Burr’s neo-gothic WWII drama Straight Into Darkness ends up resisting categorization. There’s pleasure to be had in watching a period war pic made with a personal touch and with a self-conscious pedigree, but this diminishes as Burr excessively lays on themes and action." Ian Jane from DVD Talk gave the film 3/5 stars, writing, "Straight Into Darkness is an interesting and at times almost surreal war film that does a good job of mixing horror movie elements with some serious drama. Unfortunately it gets a little buried under its own message but that doesn't mean it isn't worthwhile."
Jon Condit from Dread Central awarded the film a score of 2.5 out of 5, calling it "fundamentally flawed", but commended the film's visuals.

References

External links
 
 
 

2004 films
2004 horror films
2000s war films
American horror films
American war films
Films directed by Jeff Burr
Films scored by Michael Convertino
American World War II films
Horror war films
2000s English-language films
2000s American films